William Lambton (1640–1724) of New Lambton in County Durham was an English politician who sat in the English and British House of Commons between 1685 and 1713.

Lambton was the eldest son of Henry Lambton and his wife Mary Davison, daughter of Sir Alexander Davison of Blakiston. He matriculated at Queen's College, Oxford in 1659. In 1693, he succeeded to his father's estate.

Lambton was returned unopposed as a member of parliament for County Durham at the English general elections of 1685, 1689, 1690 and 1695. He was defeated in 1698, but was returned unopposed again in the two general elections of 1701. He did not stand in 1702 and was next returned as MP for Durham County at the 1710 British general election. He did not stand again.

Lambton died unmarried in 1724, and his estates passed to his nephew Henry Lambton (son of Ralph Lambton), who served for a long time as member for the City of Durham.

References
Burke's Peerage (1939 edition), s.v. Durham

 

Members of the Parliament of Great Britain for English constituencies
People from Washington, Tyne and Wear
Politicians from Tyne and Wear
1640 births
1724 deaths
British MPs 1710–1713
English MPs 1685–1687
English MPs 1689–1690
English MPs 1690–1695
English MPs 1695–1698
English MPs 1701
English MPs 1701–1702